The 2014 European Juniors Wrestling Championships was held in Warsaw, Poland between June 17–22, 2014.

Medal table

Team ranking

Medal summary

Men's freestyle

Men's Greco-Roman

Women's freestyle

References 

Wrestling
European Wrestling Juniors Championships
Sports competitions in Warsaw